Elmswell is a hamlet in the East Riding of Yorkshire, England. It lies just to the south of the A166 road.

It forms part of the civil parish of Garton on the Wolds.

Elmswell Old Hall was designated a Grade II* listed building in 1966 and is now recorded in the National Heritage List for England, maintained by Historic England.

References

External links

Villages in the East Riding of Yorkshire